Meductic Indian Village / Fort Meductic (also known as Medoctec, Mehtawtik meaning "the end of the path") was a Maliseet settlement until the mid-eighteenth century. It was located near the confluence of the Eel River and Saint John River in New Brunswick, four miles upriver from present-day Meductic, New Brunswick.  The fortified village of Meductic was the principal settlement of the Maliseet First Nation from before the 17th century until the middle of the 18th, and it was an important fur trading centre.  (The other two significant native villages in the region were the Abenaki village of Norridgewock (present-day Madison, Maine) on the Kennebec River and Penobscot (present-day Penobscot Indian Island Reservation) on the Penobscot River. Only during King George's War, after the French established Saint Anne (present-day Fredericton, New Brunswick), did the village Aukpaque, present-day Springhill, New Brunswick, become of equal importance to Meductic).

The village contained Fort Meductic, which the Maliseet had built before the arrival of the French to defend against Mohawk attacks. The Mohawk were one of the Five Nations of the Iroquois Confederacy, based in present-day New York, south of the St. Lawrence River and generally west of the Hudson River. This is reported to have been the first Fort in Acadia.

Father Joseph Aubery re-established the mission in 1701. During the lead up to Father Rale's War, to secure the French influence on the village, Priest Jean-Baptiste Loyard built the chapel Saint Jean Baptiste (1717). (The bell was given by King Louis XV.)  Similarly, the French claimed territory on the Kennebec River by building a church in the Abenaki village of Norridgewock.

The Meductic village and fort location is a National Historic Site. A federal plaque from the Historic Sites and Monuments Board was placed on a cairn on Fort Meductic Road, near the site. [As of April 2020, the plaque was missing from the cairn.] Official recognition refers to the polygon around the archaeological remains.

Related to the site, the Meductic-Eel River Portage was designated a National Historic Event in 1943. It was part of the route between Acadia and New England, and used by France on expeditions against the English.

See also 
Military history of the Maliseet people

Footnotes

References 
Secondary Sources:
  W.O. Raymond. The Old Meductic Fort and the Indian Chapel of Saint Jean Baptiste: paper read before the New Brunswick Historical Society (1897)
 
John Grenier. (2008). The Far Reaches of Empire: War in Nova Scotia 1710-1760. University of Oklahoma Press.
Francis Parkman, The Jesuits in North America, Gutenberg Project
 
 Matteo Binasco. "Few, Uncooperative, and Endangered: The Troubled Activity of the Roman Catholic Missionaries in Acadia (1610-1710)", in Royal Nova Scotia Historical Society, Journal, vol.10 (2007), pp. 147–162.

External Links
 
 

Military forts in New Brunswick
French forts in Canada
National Historic Sites in New Brunswick
Military forts in Acadia
French and Indian War forts
Conflicts in Nova Scotia
Tourist attractions in York County, New Brunswick
Forts or trading posts on the National Historic Sites of Canada register
Maliseet